Solieria inanis is a European species of fly in the family Tachinidae.

References

Tachininae
Diptera of Europe
Insects described in 1810